Eva del Edén is a 2004 Peruvian telenovela, the story is set in Lima, Peru in 1540s during Spanish colonial regime. The show focuses on the life of Eva de Palomino, a mestizo, and her struggle for recover the land which was stolen from her.

2004 telenovelas
Peruvian telenovelas
2004 Peruvian television series debuts
2005 Peruvian television series endings
2000s Peruvian television series
Latina Televisión telenovelas
Television shows set in Peru
Spanish-language telenovelas